Ebba Kristina Andersson (born 10 July 1997) is a Swedish cross-country skier who represents the club Piteå Elit.

Andersson competed at the FIS Nordic World Ski Championships 2017 in Lahti, Finland.

In the 2018 Olympics Andersson finished fourth in the skiathlon, 0.8 seconds behind bronze medalist Krista Pärmäkoski.

Running 
Andersson has also competed in running at international junior level. During the 2015 European Championships in Eskilstuna she ended up 6th at 3 000 metres with the time 9.29,98. As a track and field athlete, she competed for Sollefteå GIF Friidrott.

Roller skiing
On 23 August 2019 she won a 7.5 kilometres roller skiing competition (without any shooting moments) in Sollefteå where cross-country skiers and biathletes competed against each other.

Cross-country skiing results
All results are sourced from the International Ski Federation (FIS).

Olympic Games
 2 medals – (1 silver, 1 bronze)

World Championships
 8 medals – (3 gold, 1 silver, 4 bronze)

World Cup

Season titles
 2 titles – (2 U23)

Season standings

Individual podiums
 5 victories – (4 , 1 )
 34 podiums – (21 , 13 )

Team podiums
 4 podiums – (4 )

References

External links

1997 births
Living people
Swedish female cross-country skiers
FIS Nordic World Ski Championships medalists in cross-country skiing
Cross-country skiers at the 2018 Winter Olympics
Cross-country skiers at the 2022 Winter Olympics
Olympic cross-country skiers of Sweden
Medalists at the 2018 Winter Olympics
Medalists at the 2022 Winter Olympics
Olympic silver medalists for Sweden
Olympic bronze medalists for Sweden
Olympic medalists in cross-country skiing
People from Sollefteå Municipality
21st-century Swedish women